The Month of the Falling Leaves is a 1963 novel by Scottish writer Bruce Marshall.

Plot summary
A philosophy professor is mistaken for a spy.

Adaptions
This novel was the basis of the 1968 German TV film Der Monat der fallenden Blätter. It was directed by Dietrich Haugk.

References

Novels by Bruce Marshall
1963 British novels
Constable & Co. books
British novels adapted into films
British novels adapted into television shows